Salah Ibrahim (born 1 July 1947) is a former Iraqi football midfielder who played for Iraq in the 1972 AFC Asian Cup.

Salah played for the national team between 1971 and 1972.

References

Iraqi footballers
Iraq international footballers
1972 AFC Asian Cup players
Living people
Association football defenders
1947 births